Raith Rovers competed in the Scottish First Division, Scottish Cup, Scottish League Cup & Scottish Challenge Cup during the 2010–11 season.

Fixtures
*Note: Tayport, Whitehill Welfare & Civil Service Strollers friendlies were a Raith Rovers XI.

League table

References

2010-11
Scottish football clubs 2010–11 season